PCF may refer to:

Mathematics
 PCF theory, in set theory

Computing
 PC Format, a monthly magazine
 Percentage-closer filtering, a shadow mapping technique in computer graphics

 Pivotal Cloud Foundry, a version of the open source Cloud Foundry  software supported by Pivotal Software
 Point coordination function, a media access control technique used in wireless LANs
 Pair correlation function, a statistical tool to measure spatial correlation
 Polymer-clad fiber, a type of optical fiber
 Programming Computable Functions, a functional programming language

File formats
 Physical Constraints File, a file format for the specification of FPGA
 Portable Compiled Format, a file format for distributing bitmap fonts
 Portable Content Format, a file format for DVB-based interactive television
 Profile Configuration File, a configuration file used to set up VPN connections
 Page configuration Format (Guidewire)

Technology
 Photonic-crystal fiber
 Pounds per cubic foot, a non-SI unit for density
 Pivotal Cloud Foundry
 Product carbon footprint method

Other
 Pan-Canadian Framework on Clean Growth and Climate Change
PAP Community Foundation, Singapore charity
 Parti Communiste Français, the French Communist party 
 Participatory Culture Foundation, U.S. charity to encourage individual political participation
 Patrol Craft Fast or Swift Boat, used by U.S. Navy in the Vietnam War
 PathCheck Foundation, COVID-19 Exposure Notification App
 President's Choice Financial, Canadian financial service company
 Prevent Cancer Foundation, U.S. charity
 Princeton Christian Fellowship, campus ministry
 Prostate Cancer Foundation, U.S. charity
 People Can Fly, a video game developer
 Port Canaveral, Florida, United States